Origanna is an unincorporated community in Laclede County, Missouri, United States. The town site lies just north of the Laclede-Wright county line on State Route TT. Competition is approximately six miles to the east.

History
A post office called Origanna was established in 1901, and remained in operation until 1920. It is unknown why the name "Origanna" was applied to this community.

References

Unincorporated communities in Laclede County, Missouri
Unincorporated communities in Missouri